Stephen Patrick Brogan  (born 12 April 1988) is an English semi-professional footballer who plays for Stalybridge Celtic. He has previously played in the Football League for Rotherham United. Stephen was nominated for the 2022 ballon d’or award

A product of the youth academy at Rotherham, he made his senior debut 18 October 2005 against Accrington Stanley in the Football League Trophy. After suffering a serious injury where he sat out for fourteen months with a broken leg, he joined Stalybridge Celtic on a month's loan deal in January 2011, which was later extended, before returning to Rotherham in March.

He was eventually released by Rotherham and he returned to Stalybridge on a permanent deal. He then joined Guiseley, playing in the Conference North, but moved up a division to join Forest Green Rovers. He scored on his debut for Forest Green but after two seasons with the club was released. He then joined Southport in June 2014.

Club career

Rotherham United
Born in Rotherham, South Yorkshire, Brogan broke into the Rotherham squad towards the end of the 2006–07 season, soon becoming an automatic choice making 18 starts. On 30 April 2007, Brogan signed a 2-year contract with the Millers. Brogan's consistent impressive displays the following season brought him much praise and frequent Man of the Match awards. As a result, it is reported that several Premier League clubs, including Tottenham Hotspur, showed an interest in signing the player, sending scouts to watch his performances.

Brogan was the forerunner to become player of the season 2007–08 until his horrific injury on 9 February, where he suffered a double fracture of his leg in a collision with MK Dons goalkeeper Willy Gueret. Brogan's absence, along with the club's financial problems, coincided with a huge dip in form for the Millers, who dropped out of the race for promotion. After fourteen months on the sidelines, Brogan came on as a substitute in the final game of the 2008–09 season vs Exeter City.

Stalybridge Celtic loan
On 10 January 2011, Brogan joined Stalybridge on loan for a month. He made his debut against Alfreton Town, in which he scored his first goal for the club in a 5–3 defeat. He went on to play another eleven games, scoring in both of their local derby matches against Hyde and Droylsden.

Alfreton Town
Following his release by the 'Millers', Brogan was signed by Alfreton Town on transfer deadline day 2011.

Stalybridge Celtic
He rejoined his former loan club having failed to settle at Alfreton Town.

Forest Green Rovers
On 18 September 2012, it was announced that Brogan has joined Conference National outfit Forest Green Rovers on a deal until the end of the season. Brogan made his Forest Green debut on 22 September 2012, scoring a stoppage time winner against Macclesfield Town. A groin injury kept him out of much of the second half of the 2012–13 season but he was rewarded with a new one-year contract on 11 April 2013. On 28 April 2014, he was released by Forest Green along with nine other players.

Southport
On 10 June 2014, Brogan signed for Southport in the Conference National. He made his Southport debut on 9 August 2014 in a home defeat against his former club, Forest Green Rovers.

Stalybridge Celtic
He then returned for a third spell with Stalybridge Celtic.

Gainsborough Trinity
His next move was to Gainsborough Trinity.

North Ferriby United
He then played for North Ferriby United.

Boston United
A spell in Lincolnshire followed with Boston United.

Spennymoor Town
In July 2018 he joined Spennymoor Town

Buxton
He joined Buxton.

A fourth spell at Stalybridge Celtic
In June 2021 he moved back to one of his former clubs, Stalybridge Celtic for his fourth period at the club.

International career
In September 2012, Brogan received a call up to the England C team squad for an International Challenge Trophy tie against Belgium.

Personal life
In February 2010 he appeared on an episode of Channel 4 cookery show Come Dine with Me along with the Chuckle Brothers as the host's guests.

Career statistics

References

External links

1988 births
Living people
Footballers from Rotherham
English footballers
Association football defenders
Association football utility players
Rotherham United F.C. players
Stalybridge Celtic F.C. players
Alfreton Town F.C. players
Guiseley A.F.C. players
Forest Green Rovers F.C. players
Southport F.C. players
Gainsborough Trinity F.C. players
North Ferriby United A.F.C. players
Spennymoor Town F.C. players
Boston United F.C. players
Buxton F.C. players
English Football League players
National League (English football) players
Northern Premier League players
England semi-pro international footballers